Aiken is an unincorporated community in western Floyd County, Texas, United States.  It lies along U.S. Route 70 north of the city of Floydada, the county seat of Floyd County.  Its elevation is 3,300 feet (1,006 m).  Although Aiken is unincorporated, it has a post office, with the ZIP code of 79221.

Aiken was founded by landowner Frank Aiken, who built the community along the Santa Fe Railway and had a post office established in August 1922.

References

External links
Profile of Aiken from the Handbook of Texas Online

Unincorporated communities in Floyd County, Texas
Unincorporated communities in Texas